The 1976 Clemson Tigers baseball team represented Clemson University in the 1976 NCAA Division I baseball season. The team played their home games at Beautiful Tiger Field in Clemson, South Carolina.

The team was coached by Bill Wilhelm, who completed his nineteenth season at Clemson.  The Tigers reached the 1976 College World Series, their third appearance in Omaha.

Roster

Schedule

References

Clemson
Clemson Tigers baseball seasons
Atlantic Coast Conference baseball champion seasons
College World Series seasons